Jim "Spider" Kelly (25 February 1912 – death unknown) born in Derry was an Irish professional feather/light/welter/middleweight boxer of the 1920s, 1930s and 1940s who won the Irish flyweight title, British Boxing Board of Control (BBBofC) Northern Ireland Area featherweight title, BBBofC British featherweight title, and British Empire featherweight title, his professional fighting weight varied from , i.e. Middleweight.

References

External links

Image - Jim Kelly
Image - Jim Kelly

1912 births
Featherweight boxers
Lightweight boxers
Middleweight boxers
Male boxers from Northern Ireland
Place of death missing
Sportspeople from Derry (city)
Welterweight boxers
Year of death missing
Irish male boxers